Tangi Valley (also known as Wardak Valley or Tangi Wardak) is located in the south of Wardak Province in Afghanistan. Between 2009 and 2011 it was occupied by US forces, and became known for the large number of US troops killed there. It was considered at important area and hence was a focus of insurgent activity due to its proximity to Kabul, the capital of Afghanistan.

The 2011 Chinook shootdown took place in the Tangi Valley. The day was the single biggest loss of US lives in Afghanistan.

By 2014, the Taliban had taken over the valley, with the central government at the time no longer having presence or control.

References

Valleys of Afghanistan
Landforms of Maidan Wardak Province